Soy Kroon (born 18 June 1995) is a Dutch actor. He is known for his role as Sil Selmhorst in the soap opera Goede tijden, slechte tijden and the spin-off series Nieuwe Tijden. He is also known for his role as Diederik in the Flemish television series Galaxy Park.

Career

Film, television and theater 

At a young age, he moved to Antwerp, Belgium to play in the Flemish television series Galaxy Park. In 2011, he played a role in the musical Oorlogswinter, a story which takes place during the winter of 1944–1945. The musical is based on the book Winter in Wartime by Dutch author Jan Terlouw. He also played a role in other musicals and theater productions, including War Horse, Vamos!, Mamma Mia! and Goodbye, Norma Jeane.

In 2020, he played a role in the television series Hoogvliegers, a coming of age story in which he plays a young man training to become an F-16 pilot. In 2021 and 2022, he plays the role of Amon, a pyramid builder, in ONE de musical, which is set during Ancient Egypt. He was nominated for a 2022 Musical Award for his role in the musical.

In 2022, he played the role of Jesus in The Passion, a Dutch Passion Play held every Maundy Thursday since 2011. He was the youngest actor to play the role of Jesus. In the same year, Kroon and Flemish actor Thomas Cammaert played in the stage play Trompettist in Auschwitz, a play based on the true story of trumpet player Lex van Weren who survived his stay in the Auschwitz concentration camp during World War II.

He appeared in the 2021 film Liefde Zonder Grenzen directed by Appie Boudellah and Aram van de Rest. He also appeared in the 2022 film Costa!! directed by Jon Karthaus. Kroon and Abbey Hoes released the song Samen Met Jou, as can be heard in the film, about a week after the film's release after popular demand.

He won the Televizier-Ster Talent award at the 2022 Gouden Televizier-Ring Gala.

In 2023, he plays the lead role in the play Nu ik je zie based on the book of the same name by Merlijn Kamerling. , he is scheduled to appear in the 2023 Netflix film Oei, ik groei!.

, Kroon and Dieuwertje Blok are scheduled to present the Concert on the Amstel in Amsterdam, Netherlands on Liberation Day (5 May).

Television appearances 

In 2020, he appeared in the photography game show Het perfecte plaatje in which contestants compete to create the best photo in various challenges. His exit in the show generated discussion and, in the next season, the producers of the show modified the rules to allow the jury to keep someone in the game. In 2022, he performed as drag queen Dee Dee Sky in the drag queen show Make Up Your Mind. He also won the final of that season of the show. In that same year, he appeared in the quiz shows Weet Ik Veel and De Quiz van het Jaar.

He appeared in the 23rd season of the television show Wie is de Mol?. He left the show in the episode before the final and he finished in third place.

Personal life 

Kroon is in a relationship with Dutch actress and presenter Holly Mae Brood. They met in 2016 at an audition for the television series Nieuwe Tijden. In 2017, Kroon and Brood appeared in an episode of the game show De Jongens tegen de Meisjes. In 2018, they both won the fourth season the television show Dance Dance Dance.

Kroon is an only child but he was once a twin. His parents separated when he was 15 years old.

Awards 

 Televizier-Ster Talent (2022)

Filmography

Film 

 Sinterklaas en de vlucht door de lucht (2018)
 Waar is het grote boek van Sinterklaas? (2019)
 K3: Dans van de farao (2020)
 Zwaar Verliefd! 2 (also known as Something About Love, Heavily in Love 2)
 Liefde Zonder Grenzen (2021)
 Costa!! (2022)
 Oei, ik groei! (upcoming, 2023)

Television 

 Lisa's Missie (2009)
 Tien Torens Diep (2010)
 Galaxy Park (2011 – 2014)
 Goede tijden, slechte tijden (2016 – 2018)
 Nieuwe Tijden (2016 – 2018)
 Hoogvliegers (2020)

As contestant 

 De Jongens tegen de Meisjes (2017)
 Dance Dance Dance (2018)
 Het perfecte plaatje (2020)
 Make Up Your Mind (2022)
 Weet Ik Veel (2022)
 De Quiz van het Jaar (2022)
 Wie is de Mol? (2023)

References

External links 

 

Living people
1995 births
People from Eindhoven
21st-century Dutch male actors
Dutch male film actors
Dutch male stage actors
Dutch male television actors
Dutch male soap opera actors